Shahrak Tatar (also Romanized as Shahraḵ Tātār; also known as Ḩalīmābād and Kalāteh-ye Qā‘enī) is a village in Badranlu Rural District, in the Central District of Bojnord County, North Khorasan Province, Iran. At the 2006 census, its population was 882, in 230 families.

References 

Populated places in Bojnord County